The Miss Universo Uruguay 2006 was held on March 18, 2006. There were 18 candidates for the national title. The winner represented Uruguay at Miss Universe 2006, Reina Hispanoamericana 2006 and Miss Continente Americano 2006. The First Runner-Up was entered for Miss Maja Mundial 2006; the Second Runner-Up Miss Intercontinental 2006; the Third Runner-Up Miss Globe International 2006 and the Fourth Runner-Up Supermodel of the World 2006. The Best Departmental Costume would be used in Miss Universe.

Results
Miss Universo Uruguay 2006 : Fatimih Dávila (Maldonado)
1st Runner-Up : Shashnaia Dogliotti (Cerro Largo)
2nd Runner-Up : Inés Gaggero (Río Negro)
3rd Runner-Up : Laura Vaamonde (Distrito Capital)
4th Runner-Up : Erika Falken (Lavalleja)

Top 10

Xiomara Joriod (Com. Uruguaiana en EU)
Oliva Landro (Soriano)
Simontte de Vargas (Montevideo)
Laura Fernández (Rivera)
Denise Palitinne (Artigas)

Special awards
 Miss Photogenic (voted by press reporters) - Denise Palitinne (Artigas)
 Miss Congeniality (voted by Miss Universo Uruguay contestants) - Myriam Toledo (Rocha)
 Miss Internet - Fatimih Dávila (Maldonado)
 Best Look - Laura Vaamonde (Distrito Capital)
 Best Face - Xiomara Joriod (Com. Uruguaiana en EU)
 Best Departemental Costume - Sarah Taveres (Colonia)

Delegates

Artigas - Denise Palitinne
Canelones - Ana Deliote
Cerro Largo - Shashnaia Dogliotti
Colonia - Sarah Taveres
Com. Uruguaiana en EU - Xiomara Joriod
Distrito Capital - Laura Vaamonde 
Florida - Carolina Cáceres
Lavalleja - Erika Falken
Maldonado - Fatimih Dávila

Montevideo - Simontte de Vargas
Paysandú - Sandy Pontevedra
Río Negro - Inés Gaggero 
Rivera - Laura Fernández 
Rocha - Myriam Toledo
Salto - Alicia Benítez
Soriano - Oliva Landro
Tacuarembó - Ynes Santíeliz
Treinta y Tres - Victoria Hernández

External links

Historia de Miss Uruguay
http://www.bellezavenezolana.net/news/2006/marzo/20060319.htm

Miss Universo Uruguay
2006 beauty pageants
2006 in Uruguay